Russalka Memorial is a bronze monument sculpted by Amandus Adamson, erected on 7 September 1902 in Kadriorg, Tallinn, Estonia (then part of the Russian Empire) to mark the ninth anniversary of the sinking of the Russian warship , or "Mermaid", which sank en route to Finland in 1893. It was the first monument in Estonia made by an Estonian sculptor. The monument depicts an angel holding an Orthodox cross towards the assumed direction of the shipwreck. The model for the angel was the sculptor's housekeeper.

In 2005, Eesti Post, the national postal service company issued a postage stamp series for the 150th anniversary of the sculptor Adamson, with the Russalka Memorial depicted on the cover.

References

External links

Monuments and memorials in Estonia
Buildings and structures in Tallinn
Kesklinn, Tallinn
History of Tallinn
Buildings and structures completed in 1902